The Truman Center for National Policy (CNP) is an American non-profit, public policy think-tank headquartered in Washington, D.C.

According to its mission statement, the Center for National Policy is “dedicated to advancing the economic and national security of the United States.” CNP's stated goal is to “connect senior policy makers with the most innovative research and thought leadership on issues that impact America’s security.” CNP currently has projects focused on the American workforce, democracy and development, innovation, resilience, and defense. CNP frequently holds events, roundtables, and policy meetings that feature experts in national and economic security issues.

History
The Center for National Policy was founded in 1981.  Peter Kovler, director of the Marjorie Kovler Fund, serves as chairman of the center, succeeding Leon Panetta, CNP's national advisory board chair and former White House Chief of Staff.

Previous presidents and chairmen of CNP include the U.S. ambassador to India and former six-term member of Congress, Tim Roemer, three former U.S. Secretaries of State: Madeleine Albright, Edmund Muskie, and Cyrus Vance. Other CNP Board members have included former U.S. Treasury Secretary Robert Rubin, former Speaker of the U.S. House of Representatives Thomas Foley, former Republican members of Congress Jack Buechner and Rod Chandler, and former Democratic members of Congress John Brademas and Michael Barnes.

Edmund S. Muskie Distinguished Public Service Award

The Edmund S. Muskie Distinguished Public Service Award honors the late Edmund Muskie (1914–1996) who served our nation in the Navy, as governor of Maine, as U.S. senator and as U.S. Secretary of State. Following his retirement from government service, Ed Muskie chaired the CNP board. Since 1996, the Muskie Award has been presented at an annual event honoring the recipients’ demonstrated commitment to public service and significant contributions to the country.

Past Muskie recipients

1996
Secretary Madeleine Albright, U.S. State Department

1997
Hon. Lee Hamilton, U.S. House of Representatives

1998
Hon. Hillary Clinton, U.S. Senate

1999
Hon. Christopher Dodd, U.S. Senate
Hon. John Warner, U.S. Senate

2000
Hon. William Cohen, Secretary of Defense

2002
Hon. Charles Rangel, U.S. House of Representatives
Hon. Amory Houghton, Jr., U.S. House of Representatives

2003
Hon. Robert Byrd, U.S. Senate
Hon. Richard Lugar, U.S. Senate

2004
Hon. Charles Hagel, U.S. Senate
Hon. Edward Kennedy, U.S. Senate

2005
Hon. John McCain, U.S. Senate
Hon. Mark Warner, Governor of Virginia

2006
Hon. John Murtha, U.S. House of Representatives

2007
Hon. Nancy Pelosi, U.S. House of Representatives
Hon. Susan Collins, U.S. Senate

2008
Hon. Joe Biden, U.S. Senate
General Brent Scowcroft, former National Security Advisor

2009
Hon. Dianne Feinstein, U.S. Senate
General James Mattis, commander, U.S. Joint Forces Command

2010
Governor Edward G. Rendell, Commonwealth of Pennsylvania
Police Commissioner Raymond W. Kelly, City of New York

2012
Secretary Leon Panetta, U.S. Department of Defense

2014
Hon. Dick Durbin, U.S. Senate

President

In January 2012, Scott Bates became the seventh president of the Center for National Policy. Bates has extensive experience on Capitol Hill, including serving as chief of staff for Congressman Nick Lampson, counsel to Congressman Jim Turner, and senior advisor to Congressman Maurice Hinchey. As secretary of state and legislative director for Governor Douglas Wilder of Virginia, Scott focused on ethics reforms in state government and development and passage of the governor's legislative agenda. Bates led an unprecedented expansion in appointments of women and minorities to state boards and commissions.

After September 11, Scott became the first senior policy advisor to the U.S. House of Representatives Homeland Security Committee and was the principal author of Winning the War on Terror, which helped inform the 9/11 Commission in its deliberations and development of its report. He helped lead the team that produced a dozen reports on homeland security issues ranging from border security to bioterrorism.

Scott Bates has been on the ground in every war zone where American troops have fought in this generation. He has worked with elected leaders and activists alike, attempting to build democracy and good governance in Iraq, Afghanistan, Kosovo, Bosnia, Haiti and the Persian Gulf. Bates has advised the Premier of South Australia and taught at the University of Pristina in Kosovo. He has been a featured speaker on defense issues and international affairs at numerous national and international conferences.

Bates taught Homeland Security at the National Defense University in Washington, D.C. He was a visiting professor of international law and international human rights law at the Indiana University School of Law, and visiting professor of government at Connecticut College. He has provided commentary for media outlets on five continents, including The New York Times, The Washington Post, The Gulf Times, The Australian, The Taipei Times, the BBC, Al Jazeera and Russia Today.

Scott Bates holds a JD from the University Of Virginia School Of Law, an MSc in international relations from the London School of Economics, and graduated magna cum laude in history and political science from the University of Dayton.

CNP board of directors

Peter B. Kovler, chairman (CNP), The Marjorie Kovler Fund, Washington, D.C. 
Michael Evans, Counsel, K&L Gates, Washington, D.C.
Michael Barnes, director, 	Covington & Burling, Washington, D.C.
John Brademas, director, New York University, New York, New York
John Bridgeland, director, Civic Enterprises, Washington, D.C. 
Rev. Cn. Robert J. Brooks, director, Episcopal Diocese of Connecticut, Storrs, Connecticut
Jack Buechner, director, Anderson Kill & Olick, Washington, D.C.
Robert Cavnar, director, Milagro Exploration, Houston, Texas
Elizabeth Folsom, director, Academy for Educational Development, Washington, D.C.
John Freidenrich, director, Regis Management Company, Palo Alto, California
David Geanacopoulos, director, Volkswagen of America, Washington, D.C.
Daniel Glickman, director, Motion Picture Association of America, Washington, D.C.
Lester Hyman, director, Swidler & Berlin, Washington, D.C.
Markos Kounalakis, director, The Washington Monthly, Washington, D.C.
Ira Lechner, director, Katz & Ranzman
Paul McHale, director, McKenna Long & Aldridge
Maurice Tempelsman, director, Lazare Kaplan International, New York, New York
Samuel Tenenbaum, director, Lexington, South Carolina
Peter Thoren, director, Access Industries, New York, New York

References

External links 
Truman Center for National Policy Homepage

Think tanks based in Washington, D.C.
1981 establishments in Washington, D.C.
Think tanks established in 1981